Wilcox Building may refer to:

Wilcox Building (Los Angeles),  Downtown Los Angeles (built 1896) — at the southeast corner of Spring Street and 2nd Street.
Wilcox Building (Portland, Oregon), NRHP-listed
Albert Spencer Wilcox Building, Lihue, Hawaii — see also Albert Spencer Wilcox Beach House
Wilcox Female Institute, Camden, Alabama, NRHP-listed
Peck, Stow & Wilcox Factory, Southington, Connecticut, NRHP-listed
Wilcox, Crittenden Mill, Middletown, Connecticut, NRHP-listed
Wilcox School-District 29, Ransom, Kansas, listed on the NRHP in Kansas

See also
Wilcox House (disambiguation)